Kirill Sidorenko (born March 30, 1983) is a Russian professional ice hockey forward. He was selected by Dallas Stars in the 6th round (180th overall) of the 2002 NHL Entry Draft.
Sidorenko played in the Russian Superleague with Novosibirsk Siber during the 2002–03 season, and with Krylja Sovetov during the 2006–07 season.

Career statistics

Regular season and playoffs

References

External links

Living people
1983 births
Arlan Kokshetau players
Avangard Omsk players
Beibarys Atyrau players
Dallas Stars draft picks
Energia Kemerovo players
Gornyak Rudny players
HC Almaty players
HC Astana players
HC CSK VVS Samara players
HC Izhstal players
HC Lipetsk players
HC Sibir Novosibirsk players
HC Temirtau players
Kristall Saratov players
Krylya Sovetov Moscow players
Kulager Petropavl players
Russian people of Ukrainian descent
Russian ice hockey forwards
Titan Klin players
Yertis Pavlodar players
Zauralie Kurgan players